Bolong is a locality in the City of Shoalhaven in New South Wales, Australia. It lies to the north of the Shoalhaven River and to the west of Broughton Creek. It is northeast of Nowra.

Bolong had a public school from November 1861 to December 1963, although it was called Boolong Public School until around 1900.

References

City of Shoalhaven
Localities in New South Wales